Adrián Mateos Díaz (born 1 July 1994) is a Spanish professional poker player.

At the age of 19, he won the 2013 World Series of Poker Europe Main Event for €1,000,000. He also won an event on the Estrellas Poker Tour in Madrid in January 2013 for €103,000. In May 2015, Mateos won the European Poker Tour Grand Final in Monte Carlo, earning €1,082,000. With the win, he became the first Spanish EPT champion. At 22 years old, he became the youngest player to ever win three WSOP bracelets.

As of March 2023, his total live tournament winnings exceed $32 million.

World Series of Poker bracelets 

An "E" following a year denotes bracelet(s) won during the World Series of Poker Europe

References

External links

Adrian Mateos Wins 2017 Card Player Player of the Year Award
Adrian Mateos Wins 2016 World Series of Poker $1,500 Summer Solstice No-Limit Hold'em Event
Adrian Mateos Wins The 2013 World Series of Poker Europe Main Event
Adrián Mateos Díaz Wins Estrellas Poker Tour Madrid

1994 births
Living people
Spanish poker players
World Series of Poker bracelet winners
World Series of Poker Europe Main Event winners
European Poker Tour winners